Theosony is a neologism meaning 'Sonic Theology' or 'The study of God through Sound'.

Background
Theosony is a neologism penned by Irish singer and theologian Nóirín Ní Riain. The word has both Greek and Latin elements. It is the study of sound within religion, most dominantly the Roman Catholic and Christian beliefs. When speaking to the BBC, Ní Riain said:
The Christian tradition has been dominated by the visual.

'God's sound' can be heard in nature, in human speech, and in contemplative silence. From before I learnt to speak I was always 'sounding'.

The BBC reporter added:
The transparent sound of Noírín ní Riain's voice has been described by her friend the poet John O'Donohue as "a celestial staircase, leading to the presence of the divine", and we hear it juxtaposed at times with "the frogs' chorus" (as another contributor describes it) of the sound of the monks and their traditional chant.

Bibliography
 Listen with the Ear of the Heart, An Autobiography. Veritas Publications Ireland (28 July 2009). ; 192 pgs.
 The Ear of the Heart: Weaving a Tapestry of Transformative Listening in Song and Story in: Intimacy – Venturing the Uncertainties of the Heart, Jungian Odyssey Series, Volume I, (15 March 2009). , 225 pgs.

See also
Gregorian Chant
Theology

References

External links
Theosony.com – Nóirín Ní Riain
Thesis on Theosony – by Dr. Nóirín Ní Riain

Conceptions of God